Loaird Arthur McCreary (born March 15, 1953) is a former American football tight end who played four seasons in the National Football League (NFL) with the Miami Dolphins and New York Giants. He was drafted by the Miami Dolphins in the second round of the 1976 NFL Draft. He played college football at Tennessee State University and attended Walter F. George High School in Atlanta, Georgia. McCreary was also a member of the Oklahoma Outlaws of the United States Football League.

References

External links
Just Sports Stats

Living people
1953 births
Players of American football from Georgia (U.S. state)
American football tight ends
African-American players of American football
Tennessee State Tigers football players
Miami Dolphins players
New York Giants players
Oklahoma Outlaws players
People from Crawfordville, Georgia
21st-century African-American people
20th-century African-American sportspeople